Nana Bolashvili ( November 25, 1967) is a Georgian geographer. From 2006 to 2007 she served as a deputy director of the Vakhushti Bagrationi Institute of Geography of the Tbilisi State University. Since 2007 she has served as a director of the Institute. She is the president of the Alexander Javakhishvili Geographical Society of Georgia and member of the Editorial-Publishing Board of the Journal Amirani of the International Scientific-Research Institute of Caucasiology.

Early life 
Nana Bolashvili was born on November 25, 1967, in the Borjomi, Georgia. In 1989 she finished the Faculty of Geography and Geology at Tbilisi State University specialty of Surface-water hydrology.

Career 
From 1989 to 1992 she worked in the Laboratory of the Department of Hydrology and Geoinformation Technologies of the Vakhushti Bagrationi Institute of Geography. From 1992 to 1996 she was a Postgraduate Studies student surface-water hydrology, water resources and hydrochemistry. From 1985 to 1987 she worked in the Ilia Chavchavadze Tbilisi Institute of Foreign Languages specialty of the English language.

From 1992 to 2000 Bolashvili was a Research Fellow of the Department of Hydrology and Geoinformation Technologies of the Institute.

From 2000 to 2005 she was a senior research fellow of the Department. 

In 1998 she participated in an International Training Course on "Weather modeling", in Beit Dagan, Israel; later, in 2000 and 2011-12 she participated in a course on "Satellite Meteorology" in Nanjing, China. In 2001 and 2012 she attended an emergency meeting and became a scientific advisor of the United Nations Convention to Combat Desertification. She is a member of the Scientific Board (Bonn, Germany). 

Nana Bolashvili promoted and lead the compilation of the first ``National Atlas of Georgia`` in English. The atlas was presented at the Frankfurt Book Fair in 2018, where Georgia was the guest of honor.

Research 
Her research fields cover freshet prognosis, water resource assessment and management, karst and karstic water formation. She has participated in local and international grant projects, and published articles in Georgian and international journals.

References 

Living people
1967 births
Tbilisi State University alumni
Geographers from Georgia (country)
Directors of the Vakhushti Bagrationi Institute of Geography
People from Borjomi
Women editors